Loch na h-Oidhche (Loch of the night) is a remote freshwater loch lying between Loch Torridon and Loch Maree in the Flowerdale Forest, Wester Ross, Scotland.

The loch is oblong in shape and trends north by northwest to south by southeast.  It drains by a bifurcated stream and several small lochs into Loch Maree and Loch Gairloch. The surrounding area is mountainous with Beinn an Eoin to the east and Baosbheinn to the west.  The loch was surveyed on 7 August 1902 by T.N. Johnston and John Hewitt and later charted as part of the Sir John Murray and Laurence Pullar's Bathymetrical Survey of Fresh-Water Lochs of Scotland 1897-1909.

Wild brown trout are known to inhabit the loch.

References

See also 
 List of lochs in Scotland

Oidhche
Oidhche